Myint Kyu (born 20 August 1950) is a Burmese football manager and former player.

Early life

As a child, his father, Ba Juu, played for the national team.

Career

Aged 20, Kyu made his debut for the national team; he would later make one substitute appearance in the 1972 Olympics in a 1-0 loss to the Soviet Union. In 1977, he retired from international football. He became coach of his former club Finance and Revenue when the league was restructured in 1996. He then joined Southern Myanmar, which is owned by businessman  Htay Myint, chairman of the conglomerate Yuzana Company, in 2009 as team manager; he has held that position since the club's inception as well.

References

External links
 

Burmese footballers
Myanmar international footballers
Footballers at the 1972 Summer Olympics
Olympic footballers of Myanmar
1950 births
Living people
Association football forwards
Southern Myanmar F.C. managers